is a private university in the city of Osaka, Japan. It was established in 1888, initially as a women's university.

Famous people with ties to Soai include alumni Hideo Ishikawa, Haruko Okamoto, Mihoko Shuku and Yasuhito Sugiyama.

Faculties
This university has three faculties;

Faculty of Music
Department of Music
Faculty of Humanities
Department of Humanities
Faculty of Human Development
Department of Child Development Studies
Department of Food and Nutrition Management Studies

References

External links
Soai University site

Sources
This article incorporates material from the article 相愛大学 (Sōai Daigaku) in the Japanese Wikipedia, retrieved November 4, 2007.

Educational institutions established in 1950
Buddhist universities and colleges in Japan
Private universities and colleges in Japan
Universities and colleges in Osaka
1950 establishments in Japan